Gopi Chand Mannam is an Indian cardiothoracic surgeon and the chief cardiothoracic surgeon at Star Hospitals in Hyderabad, known for the performance of over 3,000 pediatric heart surgeries. After graduating from Guntur Medical College in 1981, he worked in Jamaica for two years at Victoria Jubilee Hospital in Kingston and Savanna-la-Mar Public General Hospital in Westmoreland, before moving to the UK where he secured a fellowship from the Royal College of Surgeons of Edinburgh in 1986, followed by another fellowship from the Royal College of Surgeons of Glasgow in 1987. He worked in the UK for five years, at the end of which he secured the fellowship of the Royal College of Surgeons of London before returning to India in 1994 to join the Apollo Hospital in Hyderabad as a senior consultant in cardiothoracic surgery.

Mannam is credited with the second heart transplant surgery in Andhra Pradesh which he performed with a team of 25 doctors on 9 May 2004 at Care Hospitals in Hyderabad. He is reported to have performed over 10,000 heart surgeries of which over 3,000 were pediatric surgeries. In 2016, the Government of India awarded him the fourth highest civilian honour of the Padma Shri for his contributions to medical science.

His daughter, Nikitha Mannam, is a filmmaker, known for her short films.

References

External links 
 

Recipients of the Padma Shri in medicine
Year of birth missing (living people)
People from Guntur district
Indian cardiac surgeons
Fellows of the Royal College of Surgeons
Fellows of the Royal College of Surgeons of Edinburgh
Living people
Medical doctors from Andhra Pradesh
20th-century Indian medical doctors
20th-century surgeons